Dame Anne Beadsmore Smith  (1869 – 12 July 1960), also known as Ann or Annie, was a British nurse and British Army officer. She was a military nurse during the Second Boer War and the First World War. She then served as Matron-in-Chief of the Queen Alexandra’s Imperial Military Nursing Service from 1917 to 1924 and Matron-in-Chief of the Territorial Army Nursing Service from 1925 to 1931.

Honours
In the 1918 New Year Honours, Smith was awarded a bar to her Royal Red Cross (RRC*) "in recognition of [her] very valuable services during the war". She was also made a Chevalier of the Légion d'Honneur by France for her war service, and she was granted permission to wear the award in 1920. In the 1925 King's Birthday Honours, she was made Dame Commander of the Order of the British Empire (DBE) in recognition of her work as Matron-in-Chief of Queen Alexandra's Imperial Military Nursing Service, and thereby granted the title of dame.

References

External links
 

1869 births
1960 deaths
Members of the Royal Red Cross
Chevaliers of the Légion d'honneur
Queen Alexandra's Royal Army Nursing Corps officers
Dames Commander of the Order of the British Empire
British Army personnel of World War I
British women in World War I
People from Highbury
British Army personnel of the Second Boer War